Bavaria may refer to:

Places

Germany
 Bavaria, one of the 16 federal states of Germany
 Duchy of Bavaria (907–1623)
 Electorate of Bavaria (1623–1805)
 Kingdom of Bavaria (1805–1918)
 Bavarian Soviet Republic (1919), a short-lived communist state

Italy
 Bavaria (Nervesa della Battaglia), a town

United States
 Bavaria, Kansas, a community
 Bavaria, Wisconsin, an unincorporated community
 Lake Bavaria, a lake in Minnesota

Beer
 Bavaria beer, a brand of FIFCO
 Bavaria Brau, a South African brewery
 Bavaria Brewery (Colombia), a Colombian brewery
 Bavaria Brewery (Netherlands), a Dutch brewery and brewer of several beers named Bavaria, including:
Bavaria non alcoholic beer

Other
 Bavaria Film, a film company based in Germany
 Bavaria (train), which ran between Munich and Zurich or Geneva
 Bavaria Yachtbau, a German sailing and motor yacht builder
 BMW Bavaria, a luxury sedan produced by BMW
 L'Entrecôte, a defunct brasserie in Geneva called The Bavaria
 , a porcelain factory

See also
 
 Babaria (Bavaria), a Koli clan of India
 Bavarian (disambiguation)
 Bavarii, a Germanic tribe
 Baviera, a neighbourhood of Valletta, Malta